The Nagenahira Nagas was a franchise cricket team that took part in  Sri Lanka Premier League, representing Eastern Province. Varun Beverages Private Limited purchased the team for $3.22 million in 2012. They was owned for seven years, after which a new agreement may be negotiated. They named Shahid Afridi as their icon player in late June.

History
Nagenahira was one of the franchises in the proposed inaugural Sri Lankan Premier League in 2011 and represents the Eastern Province. They signed Shahid Afridi as their captain but due to some issues, 2011's event was cancelled at the eleventh hour. In 2012, they were purchased at the lowest price of $3.22 million by Varun Beverages Lanka Private Limited. Initially Shahid Afridi was to lead the team as their icon player, but since his commitments to his national team made him unavailable for the latter part of the tournament, Sri Lankan all-rounder Angelo Mathews was named the icon player and the captain of the franchise.

Current squad
Players with international caps are listed in bold.

References

External links
Team site on ESPN CricInfo

Sri Lanka Premier League teams
Sports clubs in Sri Lanka
Cricket clubs established in 2012
Sports clubs disestablished in 2012
2012 establishments in Sri Lanka
Cricket in Trincomalee
2012 disestablishments in Sri Lanka